William Knowlton Zinsser (October 7, 1922 – May 12, 2015) was an American writer, editor, literary critic, and teacher. He began his career as a journalist for the New York Herald Tribune, where he worked as a feature writer, drama editor, film critic and editorial writer. He was a longtime contributor to leading magazines.

Early life and family
Zinsser attended Buckley Country Day School, Deerfield Academy and graduated from Princeton University. He married Carolyn Fraser Zinsser, with whom he had two children, including John Zinsser, a painter. The Zinssers lived in New York City and in Niantic, Connecticut. One of his cousins married Konrad Adenauer; another was the spouse of John J. McCloy; Zinsser wrote, "So it happened that the two men who collaborated most closely on the creation of the new Germany were Zinsser relatives."

Zinsser was second cousin of the painter Thomas S. Buechner.

Professional background
Zinsser taught writing at Yale University, where he was the fifth master of Branford College (1973–1979). He served as executive editor of the Book-of-the-Month Club from 1979 to 1987. He retired from teaching at The New School and the Columbia University Graduate School of Journalism because of advancing glaucoma.

His 18 books include On Writing Well, which is in the 30th edition; Writing to Learn; Writing with a Word Processor; Mitchell & Ruff (originally published as Willie and Dwike); Spring Training; American Places; Easy to Remember: The Great American Songwriters and Their Songs; Writing About Your Life; and most recently, Writing Places, an autobiography. The American Scholar ran William Zinsser's weekly web posting, "Zinsser on Friday," featuring his short essays on writing, the arts, and popular culture.

In his books, Zinsser emphasizes the word "economy". Author James J. Kilpatrick, in his book The Writer's Art, says that if he were limited to just one book on how to write, it would be William Zinsser's On Writing Well. He adds, "Zinsser's sound theory is that 'writing improves in direct ratio to the number of things we can keep out of it."

Zinsser encouraged memoir writers to believe in their own uniqueness and defined success as "doing what you want to do and doing it well".

Zinsser interviewed Woody Allen in 1963 for the Saturday Evening Post. After a chance encounter in 1980, Allen cast Zinsser, a Protestant, in a small role as a Catholic priest in his film Stardust Memories.

Death
Zinsser died at the age of 92 in Manhattan on May 12, 2015.

References

Further reading 
 Contemporary Authors Online. The Gale Group, 2006. PEN (Permanent Entry Number): 0000023043

External links 

 

 NYU's Fales Library Guide to the William Zinsser Papers
 Interview with William Zinsser (with original audio) - Modeling Success Series - Embrace Possibility
 Wesleyan Commencement Speech Transcript - Embrace Possibility Blog

1922 births
2015 deaths
American literary critics
American Protestants
Buckley Country Day School alumni
Columbia University Graduate School of Journalism faculty
Deerfield Academy alumni
Journalists from New York City
New York Herald Tribune people
The New School faculty
Yale University faculty
Writers of style guides
20th-century American journalists
20th-century American male writers
20th-century American non-fiction writers
21st-century American journalists
21st-century American male writers
21st-century American non-fiction writers
American male journalists
American male non-fiction writers